Jordan Dunstan (born March 21, 1993) is a Canadian professional soccer player who most recently played as a defender for Forge FC.

Club career

Youth and college
Dunstan played soccer at Bryan College from 2015 to 2017. He also played for NPSL side Chattanooga FC from 2014 to 2017. On May 27, 2015, Dunstan tore his ACL in a match against Atlanta Silverbacks. He spent most of 2016 recovering and did not return to full fitness until late in the year.

Nashville SC
On January 16, 2018, Nashville SC announced the signing of Jordan Dunstan ahead of their inaugural USL campaign. Dunstan returned from loan to Inter Nashville FC in July, and made his first USL appearance on July 25 in a 1–0 win over Atlanta United 2. On November 14, 2018, Nashville announced that they had not re-signed Dunstan for the 2019 season.

Forge FC
On July 31, 2020, Dunstan signed with Canadian Premier League side Forge FC.

References

External links

1993 births
Living people
Association football defenders
Canadian soccer players
Soccer players from Mississauga
Canadian expatriate soccer players
Expatriate soccer players in the United States
Canadian expatriate sportspeople in the United States
Bryan Lions men's soccer players
Chattanooga FC players
Nashville SC (2018–19) players
Inter Nashville FC players
Forge FC players
National Premier Soccer League players
USL Championship players
Canadian Premier League players